The volcano rabbit (Romerolagus diazi), also known as teporingo or zacatuche, is a small rabbit that resides in the mountains of Mexico. It is the world's second-smallest rabbit, second only to the pygmy rabbit. It has small rounded ears, short legs, and short, thick fur and weighs approximately 390–600 g (0.86–1.3 lb). It has a life span of 7 to 9 years. The volcano rabbit lives in groups of 2 to 5 animals in burrows (underground nests) and runways among grass tussocks. The burrows can be as long as 5 m and as deep as 40 cm. There are usually 2 to 3 young per litter, born in the burrows. In semi-captivity, however, they do not make burrows and the young are born in nests made in the grass tussocks.

Unlike many species of rabbits (and similar to pikas), the volcano rabbit emits very high-pitched sounds instead of thumping its feet on the ground to warn other rabbits of danger. It is crepuscular and is highly active during twilight, dawn and all times in between. Populations have been estimated to have approximately 150–200 colonies with a total population of 1,200 individuals over their entire range.

Morphology and anatomy 

The volcano rabbit’s adult weight goes up to 500 g. It has short, dense fur that ranges in color from brown to black. The rabbit is a gnawing animal that is distinguished from rodents by its two pairs specialized of upper incisors that are designed for gnawing. Their body size and hindlimb development demonstrates how they need extra grass-cover for evasion from predators. Their speediness and their hind limb development relative to their body size correlate to their necessity for evasion action. They are relatively slow and vulnerable in open habitats; therefore they take comfort in high, covered areas. They also have difficulty breeding in small enclosures. Volcano rabbits have a very narrow gestational period: In one study, all females gave birth between 39 and 41 days after coitus. They create runways similar to those made by microtine rodents to navigate their habitat. The burrows consist of dense grass clumps, with a length of 5 m and depth of 40 cm. Their small size relates to their selective dietary habits. As of 1987, they were used in one piece of scientific research.

Distribution and habitat 
Volcano rabbits are an endangered species endemic to Mexico. Specifically, the rabbit is native to four volcanoes just south and East of Mexico City, the largest of these volcanic regions is within the Izta-Popo National Park, other areas include the Chichinautzin and Pelado volcanos. The range of the volcano rabbit has been fragmented into 16 individual patches by human disturbance. Vegetation within these patches is dominated by native grasslands and include Nearctic and Neotropical varieties. Elevation of these patches is between 2900 and 3660 meters above sea level. The soil consists mostly of Andosol and Lithosol. The local climate is temperate, subhumid, and has a mean annual temperature of 11 °C. Annual rainfall averages at about 1000 millimeters. In the patches that are the most heavily populated with volcano rabbits, the plants Festuca tolucensis and Pinus hartwegii are most abundant. Volcano rabbits show strong preferences for habitat types that are categorized as open pine forests, open pine woodland, and mixed alder pine forest. Human activity in the area has had a great impact upon the preferred habitat of the volcano rabbit. Humans have fragmented the rabbits' habitat by constructing highways, farming, afforestation (i.e. planting trees where they don't belong), and lack of sound fire and grazing practices. Ecological fragmentation has been caused by environmental discontinuity.

Volcano rabbits are commonly found at higher altitudes. Almost 71% of volcano rabbits are found in pine forests, alder forests, and grasslands. Volcano rabbits are more abundant near tall, dense herbs and thick vegetation, and are adversely affected by anthropogenic environmental disturbances like logging and burning. A study on the effects of climate change upon volcano rabbit metapopulations concluded that fluctuations in climate most affected rabbits on the edge of their habitable range. The volcano rabbit's range encompasses a maximum of 280 km2 of grasslands in elevated areas in the Trans-Mexican Neovolcanic Belt.

The last unconfirmed sighting of the species at Nevado de Toluca (where no permanent colony has been historically documented) occurred in August 2003 when supposedly one volcano rabbit was observed. Since 1987, however, research conducted by Hoth et al., in relation to the distribution of the Volcano Rabbit already found no records of this species in the Nevado de Toluca, including the site where Tikul Álvarez (IPN) collected a specimen in 1975 (Nevado de Toluca, 4 km S, 2 km W Raíces, 3350 masl). Notwithstanding, although no permanent colony has been documented in Nevado de Toluca, the volcano rabbit was declared "extinct" within this portion of its range in 2018; populations exist elsewhere within the Trans-Mexican Volcanic Belt and in captivity. Due to the above, the International Union for the Conservation of Nature (Red Data Book, IUCN 2019), no longer mentions the Nevado de Toluca as a current or potential site for the distribution of this species.

Habitat management 
The IUCN/SSC Lagomorph Specialist Group has created an action plan for this rabbit that focuses upon the need to manage the burning and overgrazing of its Zacatón habitats and to enforce laws prohibiting its hunting, capture, and sale. Studies about the volcano rabbit's geographical range, role in its habitat, population dynamics, and evolutionary history have been recommended. In addition, habitat restoration and the establishment of Zacatón corridors to link core areas of habitat are needed.

Diet 
The volcano rabbit feeds primarily on grasses such as Festuca amplissima, Muhlenbergia macroura, Stipa ichu, and Eryngium rosei. The rabbits also use these plants as cover to hide from predators. M. macroura was found to be in 89% of pellets of the volcano rabbits, suggesting that this is the base of their diet, but it does not actually provide the necessary energy and protein needs of the rabbits. Supplementing their diet with 15 other forms of plant life, volcano rabbits can get their required nutrition. Other plant species that also are responsible for supporting the volcano rabbit are the Muhlenbergia quadidentata, the Pinus hartwegii, F. tolucensis, P. hartwegeii. Volcano rabbits also consume leaves, foliage, and flowers indiscriminately under poor conditions, as habitat loss has eliminated much of their food sources. In fact, protein acquisition is the primary limiting factor on the size of the populations of each of the four volcanoes on which the species is located. Studies show that many individuals of the population suffer from serious weight loss and starvation.

Seasonal changes also affect the diet of the volcano rabbit greatly. The grasses it normally consumes are abundant during wet seasons. During the dry season, the volcano rabbit feasts on shrubs and small trees, as well as other woody plants. During the winter plants, these woody plants make up most of their diet, as well as the primary building material for their nests.

Decline 
Numerous studies conducted during the 1980s and 1990s agreed that the habitat of the volcano rabbit was shrinking due to a combination of natural and anthropogenic causes. There is evidence that its range has shrunk significantly during the last 18,000 years due to a 5–6 °C increase in the prevailing temperature, and its distribution is now divided into 16 patches. The fragmentation of the volcano rabbit's distribution has resulted from a long-term warming trend that has driven it to progressively higher altitudes and the relatively recent construction of highways that dissect its habitat.

Declines in the R. diazi population have been occurring due a number of changes in vegetation, climate, and, thus, elevation. The volcano rabbit is extremely vulnerable to the effects of climate change and other anthropogenic intrusions because of its extremely limited range and specialized diet. Patches of vegetation that R. diazi uses for survival are becoming fragmented, isolated and smaller, rendering the environment more open and therefore less suitable for its survival. Because the volcano rabbit inhabits the area surrounding Mexico City, Mexico's most populous region, it has suffered a very high rate of habitat destruction.

The cottontail rabbit, Sylvilagus, is expanding into the volcano rabbit’s niche, but there is “no evidence that [volcano rabbits'] habitat selection is a response to competitive exclusion."  The volcano rabbit has been severely pressured by human intrusion into its habitat. Anthropogenic disturbance enables other rabbit species to flourish in grasslands, increasing competition with the volcano rabbit.

Volcano rabbits have been bred in captivity, but there is evidence that the species loses a significant amount of genetic diversity when it reproduces in such conditions. A comparative study done on wild and captive volcano rabbits found that the latter lost a substantial amount of DNA loci, and some specimens lost 88% of their genetic variability. There was, however, one locus whose variability was higher than that of the wild population.

Threats and conservation efforts 
Threats to R. diazi, or the volcano rabbit, include logging, harvesting of grasses, livestock grazing, habitat destruction, urban expansion, highway construction and too frequent forest fires. More recent threats include unsound management policies of its habitat in National Parks and outside, mainly by afforestation (planting trees in grasslands where they do not belong).

These threats have resulted in a loss of 15–20% of the volcano rabbit’s habitat during the last three generations. They have also resulted in ecological displacement and genetic isolation of R. diazi. Hunting is another threat to the volcano rabbit, despite the fact that R. diazi is listed under Appendix 1 of CITES and it is illegal to hunt R. diazi under Mexican law. However, many are unaware that R. diazi is protected and officials do not adequately enforce its protection. Hunting, livestock grazing, and fires can even harm R. diazi within national parks that are protected such as Izta-Popo and Zoquiapan National Parks.
In terms of conservation efforts, various captive breeding programs have been established with relative success, but infant mortality in captivity is high. Actions toward conservation should be focused on the enforcement of laws which forbid hunting and trading of the volcano rabbit. Furthermore, efforts must be put toward habitat management, specifically the control of forest fires and livestock overgrazing of grasses. Lastly, it would be beneficial to enact education programs regarding R. diazi and the various threats that face it. The public should also be educated about the volcano rabbit’s protected status, as many are unaware that it is illegal to hunt R. diazi.

References

External links 

 ARKive – images and movies of the volcano rabbit (Romerolagus diazi)
 Animal Diversity Web – Romerolagus diazi
Animalinfo.org – Volcano Rabbit

Leporidae
EDGE species
Endemic mammals of Mexico
Mammals described in 1893
Taxa named by Fernando Ferrari-Pérez
Fauna of the Trans-Mexican Volcanic Belt